Cerosterna ritsemai is a species of beetle in the family Cerambycidae. It was described by Heller in 1907. It is known from Sumatra and the Malay Peninsula.

References

Lamiini
Beetles described in 1907